Oriundi is a 2000 Brazilian drama film directed by Ricardo Bravo. It stars Anthony Quinn as an Italian of an oriundo family in Brazil. Oriundo is an Italian word used to describe foreign-born Italian nationals, especially South Americans of Italian heritage. The film was shot mostly in Curitiba, Paraná and partially at Paraná's coast.

Cast
Anthony Quinn as Giuseppe Padovani
Lorenzo Quinn as young Giuseppe Padovani
Letícia Spiller as Caterina Padovani / Sofia D'Angelo
Paulo Betti as Renato Padovani
Gabriela Duarte as Patty
Paulo Autran as Dr. Enzo
Araci Esteves as Paola
Marly Bueno as Matilde
Tiago Real as Stephano
Raquel Rizzo as Chris

References

External links
 

2000 films
2000 drama films
Brazilian fantasy drama films
Films shot in Curitiba
2000s Italian-language films
2000s Portuguese-language films
Films about immigration
2000s fantasy drama films
Films scored by Arrigo Barnabé